Arena Bowl '90 (or Arena Bowl IV) was the Arena Football League's fourth Arena Bowl.  The game featured the #2 Dallas Texans against the #1 Detroit Drive. Both teams finished their seasons at 6-2, yet the Drive led in points for (326-299) and points against (215-308).

Game summary
In the first quarter, Detroit drew first blood with Quarterback Art Schlichter getting a two-yard and a five-yard touchdown runs on Quarterback sneaks.

In the second quarter, the Drive continued to score, with FB/LB Alvin Rettig getting a one-yard touchdown run and catching an 11-yard touchdown pass from Schlichter. Afterwards, the Texans managed to get on the board with FB/LB Mitchell Ward getting a one-yard touchdown run, while Quarterback Ben Bennett completed a six-yard touchdown pass to WR/DB Aatron Kenney. However, the Drive responded with Kicker Novo Bojovic nailing a 42-yard field goal to end the half.

In the third quarter, Detroit continued its first half domination with Schlichter getting another one-yard touchdown run, while completing a 37-yard touchdown pass to WR/DB Gary Mullen.

In the fourth quarter, Dallas tried to respond with Ward getting a one-yard touchdown run and FB/LB Alvin Blackmon getting a three-yard touchdown run, yet the Drive wrapped the game up with Schlichter's two-yard touchdown run.

With the win, the Detroit Drive became the first team to achieve a three-peat, with three-straight ArenaBowl wins.

Scoring summary
1st Quarter
 DET - Schlichter 2 run (Bojovic kick)
 DET - interception Grymes, Schlichter 5 run (Bojovic kick)
2nd Quarter
 DET - Rettig 1 run (Bojovic kick)
 DET - Rettig 11 pass from Schlichter (Bojovic kick)
 DAL - Ward 1 run (Morales kick)
 DAL - Kenney 6 pass from Bennett (Morales kick)
 DET - FG Bojovic 42
3rd Quarter
 DET - Schlichter 1 run (Bojovic kick)
 DET - Mullen 37 pass from Schlichter (Bojovic kick failed)
4th Quarter
 DAL - Ward 1 run (Morales kick)
 DAL - Blackmon 3 run (Bennett pass failed)
 DET - Schlichter 2 run (Bojovic kick)

References

External links
 ArenaFan box score

004
1990 Arena Football League season
Massachusetts Marauders
Dallas Texans (Arena)
1990 in sports in Michigan
American football competitions in Detroit
1990 in American television
August 1990 sports events in the United States
1990 in Detroit